Callionymus oxycephalus, the Red Sea spiny dragonet, is a species of dragonet endemic to the Red Sea.

References 

O
Fish described in 1980